= Yxaiio =

Austrian drink

Yxaiio GmbH
- Type: Gesellschaft mit beschränkter Haftung
- Founded: Vienna, Austria (2008)
- Founder: Michael Wlazny; DI Wolfgang Langreiter
- Area served: Brazil, Spain, Portugal, Chile, Thailand
- Website: www.yxaiio.com

Yxaiio – The Hot Shot (commonly referred to as Yxaiio) is a non-alcoholic beverage produced by the Austrian company Yxaiio GmbH, based in Vienna. It is sold in 60 ml glass bottles and, according to the manufacturer, contains chili as its key ingredient, which gives the drink its distinctive heat. The product is described as a modern interpretation of traditional chili-based drinks, which were historically used by the Mayans and Aztecs.

Yxaiio was launched in the Spanish market in 2008. In the same year, a 4-month series of events (Yxaiio night) at the El Divino club in Ibiza was held, followed by more Yxaiio nights in Barcelona, Madrid and Hamburg. In 2010, Yxaiio GmbH launched its product in Chile and Portugal, 2011 in Brazil, and 2012 in Thailand.

At the international foodbev.com Beverage Innovation Awards 2009, Yxaiio was assigned 'highly commended' in the category 'Best labelling or decorative finish’.
